Platydoris angustipes is a species of sea slug, a dorid nudibranch, shell-less marine opisthobranch gastropod mollusks in the family Discodorididae.

Distribution
This species was described from Saint Thomas, U.S. Virgin Islands. The distribution of Platydoris angustipes includes the Central American mainland, also from Florida to Panama, and the Greater Antilles, the Cayman Islands, the Lesser Antilles, the Turks and Caicos, and Brazil.

Description
The mantle is rigid. The dorsum is flattened and covered with caryophyllidia. The background color ranges from reddish brown to red or orange with scattered white specks often clustered in 3–4 dense groups. The mantle margin is often darker or lighter than the rest of the mantle with proportionally more white patches. The rhinophores are dark brown with cylindrical apex. The gill is translucent straw-colored often with numerous opaque white spots.

Ecology
It was found under rocks in Panama. This species possibly has lecithotrophic development.

References
This article incorporates Creative Commons (CC-BY-4.0) text from this reference:

External links
 Alvim J & Pimenta A. D. (2013). "Taxonomic review of the family Discodorididae (Mollusca: Gastropoda: Nudibranchia) from Brazil, with descriptions of two new species". Zootaxa 3745(2): 152–198. .

Discodorididae
Gastropods described in 1863